Insulysin (Also called insulinase, insulin-degrading enzyme, insulin protease, insulin proteinase, insulin-degrading neutral proteinase, insulin-specific protease, insulin-glucagon protease, metalloinsulinase, IDE) is an enzyme. This enzyme catalyses the degradation reaction of insulin, glucagon and other polypeptides.

This cytosolic enzyme is present in mammals and in many arthropods such as the fly Drosophila melanogaster.

See also 
 Insulin-degrading enzyme

References 

http://www.jneurosci.org/content/20/23/8745.full

External links 
 

EC 3.4.24